Milo Kelsey was a member of the Wisconsin State Assembly.

Biography
Kelsey was born on May 27, 1808 in Smyrna, New York. He died in 1855.

Career
Kelsey was a member of the Assembly in 1848 and 1849. He was a Whig.

References

External links
The Political Graveyard
Geni.com

People from Chenango County, New York
Members of the Wisconsin State Assembly
Wisconsin Whigs
19th-century American politicians
1808 births
1855 deaths